Amoria grayi, common name Gray's volute, is a species of sea snail, a marine gastropod mollusk in the family Volutidae, the volutes.

Subspecies
 Amoria grayi grayi Ludbrook, 1953
 Amoria grayi kawamurai Habe, 1975
 Amoria grayi whitworthi Bail & Limpus, 2001

Description
The length of the shell varies between 45 mm and 130 mm.

Distribution
This marine species occurs off Western Australia and the Northern Territory, Australia.

References

 Bail P. & Limpus A. (2001) The genus Amoria. In: G.T. Poppe & K. Groh (eds) A conchological iconography. Hackenheim: Conchbooks. 50 pp., 93 pls.

External links
 

Volutidae
Gastropods described in 1953